Diocese of Harare may refer to:

Roman Catholic Archdiocese of Harare
Anglican Diocese of Harare